Variable State Ltd (doing business as Variable State) is a British independent video game developer established in January 2014 by Jonathan Burroughs and Terry Kenny, who are based in London, England and Dublin, Ireland respectively.

Upon forming, the company was joined by collaborator Lyndon Holland, composer and graduate of the National Film and Television School, who Burroughs and Kenny met through an internet forum. The company is owned by Jonathan Burroughs, Lyndon Holland and Terry Kenny.

The team began development of what would become Virginia in early 2014. Drawing inspiration from American television shows such as Twin Peaks and The X-Files and capitalising on Kenny's experience as an animator, Virginia progressed into a period interactive drama with an emphasis on characters and setting.

In August 2016 it was announced that 505 Games would be publishing Virginia and that the game would be releasing on September 22 for Microsoft Windows, macOS, PlayStation 4 and Xbox One. At the same time a demo was released via Steam.

On November 14, 2019, it was announced that Variable State's next game would be Last Stop. The title was published by Annapurna Interactive and released in 2021.

History 

Jonathan Burroughs and Terry Kenny, the company's founders, were both developers at DeepMind Technologies in London until shortly before it was acquired by Google in January 2016. Prior to DeepMind, Burroughs had developed for Rare and Electronic Arts on titles such as Kinect Sports and Battlefield 2: Modern Combat. Kenny had been a developer at Rockstar Games, working on a variety of titles, including Grand Theft Auto: San Andreas and Grand Theft Auto IV.

The team publicly announced development of Virginia in July 2014, releasing the first screenshots. A prototype was later produced which was exhibited at the Future of StoryTelling summit and the EGX Leftfield Collection.

Throughout development, the team regularly cited Brendon Chung's Thirty Flights of Loving as in inspiration, in particular for its use of real-time cinematic editing in the context of normal gameplay.

On August 30, 2016, video game publisher 505 Games announced they would be publishing Virginia for Microsoft Windows, macOS, PlayStation 4 and Xbox One. And communicated that the game would be releasing on September 22. The announcement coincided with the release of a public game demo for Steam. A full-length trailer was released on September 6.

In an interview earlier the same year, Burroughs mentioned work had begun on the company's new game, which would not be a Virginia sequel. However, he indicated Virginia could be extended as an anthology series, quoting Fargo and True Detective as examples, indicating that there already existed outlines for wholly new Virginia stories.

On November 14, 2019, Microsoft announced at the X019 event in London that Variable State's next game would be Last Stop. The game will be published by Annapurna Interactive and is scheduled to be released in 2021.

Games developed

Accolades

References

External links 
 

British companies established in 2014
Indie video game developers
Video game companies of the United Kingdom
Video game companies established in 2014
Privately held companies based in London
2014 establishments in England